Francis Wemyss-Charteris, 9th Earl of Wemyss, 5th Earl of March (14 August 1795 – 1 January 1883), was a Scottish peer.

Early life
Wemyss-Charteris was born 14 August 1795, the son of Francis Douglas, 8th Earl of Wemyss and the former Margaret Campbell. Among his siblings was Lady Eleanor Charteris (wife of Walter Frederick Campbell), and Lady Katherine Charteris Wemyss (who married their first cousin, George Grey, 8th Baron Grey of Groby).

His paternal grandparents were the former Susan Tracy-Keck (daughter and co-heiress of Anthony Keck and Lady Susan Hamilton, a daughter of James Hamilton, 4th Duke of Hamilton) and Francis Wemyss Charteris, Lord Elcho (the son of Francis Charteris, de jure 7th Earl of Wemyss). His maternal grandfather was Scottish landowner Walter Campbell, 3rd of Shawfield and Islay and 9th of Skipness and Eleanor Kerr (a daughter of Eleanora Nugent and Robert Kerr of Newfield, a grandson of Robert Kerr, 1st Marquess of Lothian).

He was educated at Christ Church, Oxford.

Career

From 1827 to 1830, he served as Grand Master of the Grand Lodge of Scotland. He was admitted to Royal Company of Archers, gaining the rank of Lieutenant-General in 1842.

Upon his father's death in 1853, he succeeded to the Earldoms of Wemyss and March. He served as Lord-Lieutenant of Peeblesshire from 1853 to 1880.

Personal life
On 22 August 1817, he was married to Lady Louisa Bingham (1798–1882) in Paris, France. Lady Louisa was a daughter of Richard Bingham, 2nd Earl of Lucan and Lady Elizabeth Belasyse (third daughter of Henry Belasyse, 2nd Earl Fauconberg and former wife of Bernard Howard, 12th Duke of Norfolk). They had six children:

 Francis Richard Charteris, 10th Earl of Wemyss (1818–1914), who married Lady Anne Anson, second daughter of Thomas Anson, 1st Earl of Lichfield.
 Lt.-Col. Richard Charteris (1822–1874), who married Lady Margaret Butler, a daughter of Richard Butler, 2nd Earl of Glengall. They lived at of Cahir Lodge.
 Margaret Charteris-Wemyss-Douglas (1824–1836), who died young.
 Lady Anne Charteris (1829–1903), who married George Greville, 4th Earl of Warwick in 1852.
 Lady Louisa Wemyss-Charteris (1830–1920), who married William Wells MP for Beverley and Peterborough, in 1854.
 Captain Walter Charteris-Wemyss-Douglas, (d. 1854), who was killed at the Battle of Balaclava.
 Captain Frederick William Charteris (1833–1887), who married Lady Louisa Keppel, a daughter of George Keppel, 6th Earl of Albemarle, in 1864.

They lived at 64 Queen Street in Edinburgh, one of the largest houses in Edinburgh's New Town.

Lady Wemyss died on 16 April 1882. Less than a year later, Lord Wemyss died on 1 January 1883.

References

External links
Francis Wemyss-Charteris, 9th Earl of Wemyss (1796-1883), Lord Lieutenant of Peeblesshire at the National Portrait Gallery, London

1795 births
1883 deaths
9
5
Lord-Lieutenants of Peeblesshire
Francis
Members of the Royal Company of Archers